The Roman Catholic Archdiocese of Goa and Daman comprises nineteen Deaneries consisting of 162 member parishes spread across the state of Goa.

Aldona Deanery
 Aldona - St Thomas, the Apostle
 Calvim - St Sebastian
 Moira - Immaculate Conception
 Nachinola - Bom Jesus
 Olaulim - St Anne
 Penha de Franca - Our Lady of Penha de Franca
 Pomburpa - Mother of God
 Salvador do Mundo - Saviour of the World

Bicholim Deanery
 Assonora - St Clara
 Bicholim - Our Lady of Grace
 Bodiem - St Anne
 Sanquelim - St John of the Cross
 Sirsaim - Our Lady of the Miracles
 Tivim - St Christopher
 Valpoi - Our Lady of Lourdes

Calangute Deanery
 Calangute - St Alex
 Candolim - Our Lady of Hope
 Nagoa - Holy Trinity
 Nerul - Our Lady of Remedios
 Pilerne - St John Baptist
 Reis Magos - Holy Magi
 Saligao - Our Lady the Mother of God
 Sinquerim - St Lawrence

Mapusa Deanery
 Bastora - St Cajetan
 Colvale - St Francis of Assisi
 Cunchelim - Our Lady of Flight
 Duler - St Francis Xavier
 Guirim - St Diogo
 Mapusa - St Jerome
 Porvorim - Holy Family
 Parra - St Anne
 Pirna - St Francis Xavier
 Revora - Our Lady of Victory
 Socorro - Our Lady of Succour
 Ucassaim - St Elizabeth

Pernem Deanery
 Arambol - Our Lady of Mount Carmel
 Maina (Corgao) - St Francis Xavier
 Mandrem - Our Lady of Rosary
 Morjim - Our Lady of Miracles
 Pernem - St Joseph
 Querim - St Francis Xavier 
 Tiracol - St Anthony
 Tormas - St Sebastian
 Tuem - St Francis Xavier
 Vaidongor - Our Lady of Rosary

Siolim Deanery
 Anjuna - St Michael
 Assagao - St Cajetan
 Badem - Our Lady of Miracles
 Camurlim - St Rita of Cassia
 Oxel - Our Lady of the Sea
 Siolim - St Anthony
 Tropa - Our Lady of Consolation of the Persecuted
 Vagator - St Anthony

Goa Velha Deanery
Agaçaim - St Lawrence
Azossim - St Matthew
Batim - Our Lady of Guadalupe
Curca - Our Lady of Rosary
Goa Velha - St Andrew
Mandur - Our Lady of Amparo
Neura - St John Evangelist
Siridao - Our Lady of Rosary
Talaulim - St Anne

Old Goa Deanery
Carambolim - St John Baptist
Corlim - St John Facundo
Marcel - Holy Family
Naroa - Holy Spirit
Old Goa - St Catherine
Piedade - Our Lady of Piety
São Brãs -  St Blaise
Santo Estêvão - St Stephen
São Matias - St Mathias
São Pedro - St Peter
Vanxim - Christ

Panjim Deanery
Bambolim - Our Lady of Bethlehem
Chorão - Our Lady of Grace
Merces - Our Lady of Merces
Panjim - Immaculate Conception
Ribandar - Our Lady of Help
Chorão - St Bartholomew
Santa Cruz - Holy Cross
Sant Inez - St Agnes
Taleigao - St Michael
Caranzalem - Our Lady of Rosary

Ponda Deanery
Borim - St Francis Xavier
Mardol - Our Lady of Piety
Panchwadi - St Anthony
Ponda - St Anne
Shiroda - St Joseph
Usgao - St Joseph

Benaulim Deanery
Benaulim - St John the Baptist
Benaulim - Holy Trinity
Betalbatim - Our Lady of Remedios
Carmona - Our Lady of Succour
Cavelossim - Holy Cross
Colva - Our Lady of Mercês
Orlim - St Michael
Seraulim - Our Lady of the Pilar
Varca - Our Lady of Gloria

Canacona Deanery
Agonda - St Anne
Anjediva - Church of Our Lady of Springs
Batpale - St Francis Xavier
Canacona - St Theresa of Jesus
Chiplem - Our Lady Help of Christians
Galgibaga - St Anthony
Loliem - St Sebastian
Sadolxem - Our Lady of Rosary

Chinchinim Deanery
Assolna - Our Lady Queen of Martyrs
Betul - Immaculate Conception
Cabo de Rama - St Anthony
Canaguinim - St Sebastian
Cotto de Fatorpa - Our Lady of Fatima
Cuncolim - Our Lady of Health
Dramapur - St Joseph
Sarzora - Our Lady of the Assumption
Tollecanto - St Rock
Velim - St Francis Xavier
Veroda - St Anthony
Chinchinim - Our Lady of Hope

Quepem Deanery
Ambaulim - Our Lady of Lourdes
Chandor - Our Lady of Bethlehem
Macasana - St Francis Xavier
Paroda - Immaculate Conception
Quepem - Holy Cross
Sao Jose de Areal - St Joseph
Tilamola - Our Lady Mother of the Poor

Sanguem Deanery
Collem - Our Lady of Piety
Dabal - Immaculate Conception
Rivona - Our Lady of Rosary
Sanguem - Our Lady of Miracles
Sanvordem - Guardian Angel
Vaddem - Sacred Heart of Jesus

Margao Deanery
Aquem - St Sebastian
Dicarpale - Our Lady of Fatima
Fatorda - Our Lady of Rosary
Margao - Holy Spirit Church
Margao - Our Lady of Grace 
Navelim - Our Lady of Rosary

Mormugao Deanery
Baina - Our Lady of Candelaria
Bogmalo - Sts Cosmas and Damian
Chicalim - St Francis Xavier
Cortalim - Sts Phillip and James
Desterro - Our Lady of Desterro
Mormugao - St Francis Xavier
Sancoale - Our Lady of Health
São Jacinto - St Hyacinth
Vasco da Gama - St Andrew

Verna Deanery
Cansaulim - St Thomas
Consua - Our Lady of Livra Febres
Majorda - Mother of God
Nagoa - Our Lady of Good Success
Nuvem - Mother of the Poor
Quelossim - Our Lady of the Sick
Utorda -  Our Lady of Lourdes
Velsao - Our Lady of Assumption
Verna - Holy Cross

Raia Deanery
Arlem - Our Lady of Livramento
Camurlim - Our Lady of Candelaria
Curtorim - St Alex
Loutolim - Saviour of the World
Maina - St Rita of Cassia
Rachol - Our Lady of Snows
Raia - Our Lady of Snows

References 

Christianity in Goa
Catholic Church in India
India religion-related lists
Goa-related lists
Roman Catholic churches in Goa
Churches in Goa